Eichwald is a German surname. Notable people with the surname include;

Ernst J. Eichwald (1913–2007), American pathologist
Karl Eichwald (1795–1876), Russian geologist and physician
Maria Eichwald, Kazakhstani dancer
Michaela Eichwald, German painter

German-language surnames